The 2011–12 Wake Forest Demon Deacons men's basketball team represented Wake Forest University in the 2011–2012 NCAA college basketball season. The head coach was Jeff Bzdelik, who was coaching in his second season at Wake Forest. The team played its home games at Lawrence Joel Veterans Memorial Coliseum in Winston-Salem, North Carolina, and was a member of the Atlantic Coast Conference. After another below .500 season, Athletic Director Ron Wellman reaffirmed with an, "Oh, Heavens Yes" that his longtime close friend Head Coach Jeff Bzdelik would continue to be the coach of the Wake Forest men's basketball team for the foreseeable future. In Bzdelik's first 2 seasons, 7 players transferred from the program, while Bzdelik managed to win only 5 ACC games.

Previous season
Wake finished the 2010–11 season 8–24, 1–15 in ACC play and lost in the first round of the ACC tournament.

Recruiting
Wake Forest has a 3-man recruiting class for 2011.

Roster

Schedule

|-
!colspan=9| Exhibition

|-
!colspan=9| Regular season

|-

|-
!colspan=9| ACC tournament

Leaders by Game

 Team Season Highs in Bold.

References

Wake Forest Demon Deacons men's basketball seasons
Wake Forest